The molecular formula C20H31NO (molar mass: 301.46 g/mol, exact mass: 301.2406 u) may refer to:

 Trihexyphenidyl, also known as benzhexol
 Deramciclane (EGIS-3886)

Molecular formulas